Rathfriland Rangers Football Club is a Northern Irish intermediate football club, playing in the Premier Division of the Northern Amateur Football League. The club is based in Rathfriland, County Down, was formed in 1962 and joined the Newcastle & District League before attaining intermediate status and then joining the Amateur League in 1986. The club currently consists of four teams: the 1st XI (Rangers), 2nd XI (Reserves) 3rd XI (Colts) as well as an under-17 squad. Rathfriland Rangers currently play in The Premier Division of the Northern Ireland Amateur league, whilst the 2nd team is in the Mid-Ulster Football League Reserve Championship. The Colts are in Reserve division 2 of the Mid-Ulster Football League.

Honours  

Northern Amateur Football League: Premier Division
 2021-22

 IFA Intermediate Cup: 
2021-22''

Bob Radcliffe Cup:
2019-20

Border Cup:
2016–17

Northern Amateur Football League: Division 1A
1997-98, 2015–16

Northern Amateur Football League: Division 1B
1996-97

External links  
 nifootball.co.uk - (For fixtures, results and tables of all Northern Ireland amateur football leagues)

Notes

 

Association football clubs in Northern Ireland
Association football clubs established in 1962
Northern Amateur Football League clubs
1962 establishments in Northern Ireland